A ball-peen or ball pein hammer, also known as a machinist's hammer, is a type of peening hammer used in metalworking. It has two heads, one flat and the other, called the peen, rounded. It is distinguished from a cross-peen hammer, diagonal-peen hammer, point-peen hammer, or chisel-peen hammer by having a hemispherical peen.

Uses
Besides for peening (surface hardening by impact), the ball-peen hammer is useful for many tasks, such as striking punches and chisels (usually performed with the flat face of the hammer). The peening face is useful for rounding off edges of metal pins and fasteners, such as rivets. The ball face of the hammer can also be used to make gaskets for mating surfaces. A suitable gasket material is held over the surface where a corresponding gasket is desired, and the operator will lightly tap around the edges of the mating surface to perforate the gasket material.

Variants

Variants include the straight-peen, diagonal-peen, and cross-peen hammer. These hammers have a wedge-shaped head instead of a ball-shaped head. This wedge shape spreads the metal perpendicular to the edge of the head. The straight-peen hammer has the wedge oriented parallel to the hammer's handle, while the cross-peen hammer's wedge is oriented perpendicular. The diagonal-peen hammer's head, as the name implies, is at a 45° angle from the handle. They are commonly used by blacksmiths during the forging process to deliver blows for forging or to strike other forging tools.

Head materials

Ball-peen hammer heads are typically made of heat treated forged high-carbon steel or alloy steel; it is harder than the face of a claw hammer. Softer brass heads are sometimes used.

Notes

References
 

Hammers
Metalworking hand tools
Woodworking hand tools